Wansbeck by-election may refer to one of three parliamentary by-elections held in the British House of Commons constituency of Wansbeck in Northumberland:

1918 Wansbeck by-election
1929 Wansbeck by-election
1940 Wansbeck by-election

See also
Wansbeck (UK Parliament constituency)